Simister is a small suburb in the Metropolitan Borough of Bury, Greater Manchester, England. Historically part of Lancashire, it is located between the districts of Prestwich, Rhodes and Langley.  Although the village's proximity to Manchester means the residential population is mainly made up of commuters, the village has a rural feel with much agricultural activity.

Transport
The village is located east of "Simister Island", motorway junction 18 which links the M62, M66 and M60 motorways. Thousands of vehicles a day use this motorway intersection and the traffic noise is often regarded as a nuisance but not a part of the village by the residents.
The main thoroughfare, Simister Lane, is often used as a rat run for cars travelling to and from Prestwich, Middleton and Junction 19 of the M60.

Amenities
The Simister Village Community Association, formed in 2000, was in 2010 developing a 10-acre wetland site. It has installed stone paths at a cost of £30,000 funded by grants from bodies such as "Big Lottery, Breathing Spaces" and "Greening Greater Manchester", as well as physical support from the borough council, the British Trust for Conservation Volunteers (BTCV) and local residents. Woodland maintenance will be carried out during the winter using further grants.

The unusual Grade II listed St George's Church, on Nutt Lane, was designed by R. Basnett Preston in a combination of Romanesque and vernacular revival styles. A daughter church of St Margaret's, Prestwich, it was built during the First World War and opened on 14 October 1915.

The Lady Wilton Hall, on Simister Lane, was built in 1850 at the sole expense of the Earl and Countess of Wilton, and housed the village school until the 1970s. Used for worship in the village prior to the construction of the church, as well as for the Sunday school, it continues to function as the church hall and is owned by the Parochial Church Council of St Margaret's.

There are also two public houses in the village, "The Farmers Arms" and "The Same Yet" both pubs are J W Lees houses.

History 
In August 2022, The Man Who Dreamt of Stars was filmed in the village. It was produced by award-winning director Peter Adamson. Locations included The Same Yet Inn, as well as the bus stop opposite The Farmer's Arms.

References

External links

Simister photographs

Villages in Greater Manchester
Prestwich